John Hamilton Walshe (1841 – 17 April 1893) was an Australian cricketer who played for Tasmania. He was born in England and died in Hobart.

Walshe made a single first-class appearance for the team, during the 1872–73 season, against Victoria. Batting last in the order he scored 7 and 0, both times being not out. Walshe bowled in both innings too, taking 3 for 34 and 0 for 8. He was associated with the Wellington Cricket Club in Hobart for some years.

For a few years Walshe was an engrossing clerk with the Tasmanian Lands Office, but was on sick leave for a while before his death. An inquest found that he had committed suicide by cutting his throat with a razor.

See also
 List of Tasmanian representative cricketers

References

External links
John Walshe at Cricket Archive
John Walshe at Cricinfo

1841 births
1893 deaths
Australian cricketers
Tasmania cricketers
Suicides by sharp instrument in Australia
Suicides in Tasmania
1890s suicides